Bancroft is an electoral district of the Legislative Assembly in the Australian state of Queensland. It was created in the 2017 redistribution. It is named after pioneer doctor Joseph Bancroft.

Located in the Moreton Bay Region, Bancroft consists of the north and central sections of the existing electorate of Murrumba, including the suburbs of Burpengary East, Deception Bay, North Lakes and parts of the Narangba, Rothwell, Morayfield and Mango Hill suburbs.

Members for Bancroft

Election results

See also
 Electoral districts of Queensland
 Members of the Queensland Legislative Assembly by year
 :Category:Members of the Queensland Legislative Assembly by name

References

Electoral districts of Queensland